Robert Whitaker (13 November 1939 – 20 September 2011) was a British photographer, best known internationally for his many photographs of The Beatles, taken between 1964 and 1966, with his best known work, the "Butcher Cover", which featured on the band's 1966's US-only album Yesterday and Today. He also worked with the rock group Cream, photos from which were used in the Martin Sharp-designed collage on the cover of their 1967 LP Disraeli Gears.

Biography

Early life and career
Robert Whitaker, born in Britain in 1939, described himself as "one part Aussie lad" since his father and his grandfather were both Australian. According to Whitaker, his grandfather built the Princes Bridge in Melbourne. Although he has worked mostly in Britain, Australia and Australian connections featured significantly in his life and career.

Whitaker began work in London as a photographer in the late 1950s but he moved to Melbourne in 1961, where he began studying at the University of Melbourne and became part of the small but flourishing Melbourne arts scene. According to art historian David Mellor, it was his three years in Australia that transformed Whitaker's work as a photographer. A major influence was undoubtedly his friendship with two of the leading figures of the Melbourne art world, Georges Mora and Mirka Mora, and through them he came into contact with numerous major figures in Australian art and letters including John Reed and Sunday Reed, Ian Sime, Charles and Barbara Blackman, Barrett Reid, Laurence Hope, Arthur Boyd, Sidney Nolan and Joy Hester, as well as his own peer group including Martin Sharp, Richard Neville, Barry Humphries and Germaine Greer. He photographed many of these people including Georges and Mirka Mora and their three sons, Philippe Mora (who became a noted filmmaker), future gallery owner William Mora and Tiriel Mora, later a successful Australian actor who featured in the satirical TV series Frontline and the acclaimed comedy film The Castle.

Meeting The Beatles
Whitaker was running a freelance penthouse photo studio in Flinders Street, Melbourne when he had his fateful meeting with The Beatles and their manager Brian Epstein, during their 1964 Australian tour. His meeting came about more or less by accident, when he was asked to accompany a journalist friend to an interview with Brian Epstein for an article for Melbourne community newspaper The Jewish News. Whitaker's first published photograph featuring the group depicted Paul McCartney and George Harrison each holding up boomerangs presented to them by their Australian fans.

Robert Whitaker: "I photographed Epstein, saw he was a bit of a peacock and a cavalier, and put peacock feathers around his head in photographic relief. He was knocked out when he saw the picture. After that, he saw an exhibition of collages I had at the Museum of Modern Art and immediately offered me the position of staff photographer at NEMS, photographing all his artists. I initially turned it down, but after seeing The Beatles perform at Festival Hall I was overwhelmed by all the screaming fans and I decided to accept the offer to return to England ".

Whitaker accepted the job three months later, but before he left he spent one final Sunday at the Aspendale beach house of his friends Georges and Mirka Mora, taking a set of historic pictures which were exhibited for the first time in the Monash Gallery of Art's 2003 exhibition of his work. In one photograph, "Aspendale Beach", the Mora family - Georges, Mirka and their sons Philippe, William and Tiriel - are pictured in slouched, single file on the beach with Martin Sharp and architect Peter Burns. In another photograph, "Goodbye Bob", the same group of people sit holding a sign which reads: "GOD bless thee and keep thee … ASPENDALE 1964".

On his arrival in England in August 1964, Whitaker set to work photographing the members of the NEMS stable including Billy J. Kramer & The Dakotas, Gerry & The Pacemakers (including cover shots for the How Do You Like It and Ferry Across The Mersey LPs) and Cilla Black (including cover shots for the Cilla and Cilla Sings A Rainbow LPs). He also did several photographs of the hugely successful Australian folk-pop group The Seekers, including the cover shots for Seekers Seen In Green (1967); his Seekers photos were also later used for the CDs Live At The Talk Of The Town and The Seekers Complete boxed set and a more recent photo of Judith Durham was used on the cover of her 2001 solo CD Hang On to Your Dream.

But it was with The Beatles and especially John Lennon, with whom he became close friends, that Whitaker created his most famous and enduring work. On of his first assignments was photographing The Beatles during their triumphant second American tour, including the historic Shea Stadium concert in New York. He spent the next two years travelling with the Beatles and shooting them at work, at rest and at play—on their tours, at home, in the recording studio, during private moments, and in formal photo sessions. Among his best-known images of The Beatles are the album cover photos featured on their 1966 LP Revolver and the compilation album A Collection of Beatles Oldies.

With almost unlimited access to the most famous and popular band in the world, Whitaker quickly became a key figure of the London underground scene, capturing "the creativity and excess of London in the sixties". He has been quoted as saying: "There were about 100 people who ran the Sixties" and he was fortunate enough to meet, work with and/or photograph them virtually all of them.

As the group's 'court photographer' Whitaker was able to photograph the Fab Four in many moods and situations. He accompanied The Beatles on their 1966 tour of Japan. In Tokyo the tour promoter gave him a Nikon 21mm wide-angle lens with which he took numerous shots of The Beatles relaxing in their hotel room at the Tokyo Hilton. These include several photographs of the four at work on a collaborative painting "Images of A Woman", the only such artwork they ever undertook, and a colour photo of the group inspecting antiques, which was used on the back cover of the compilation album A Collection of Beatles Oldies.

But without doubt his most celebrated work is the 1966 photo which was appropriated for The Beatles’ (in)famous Yesterday & Today album cover in the USA.

"The Butcher Sleeve"
On 25 March 1966 The Beatles went to Whitaker's Chelsea studio for a session intended to take photos for the cover of (and/or to promote) their forthcoming single, "Rain/Paperback Writer". Band and photographer were all determined to create something more than the run-of-the-mill publicity shots. Among the resulting images was that which has since become known as the "Butcher" photo, depicting The Beatles wearing white coats and draped with dismembered doll parts, artificial eyes, slabs of meat and false teeth.

This now-legendary image, one of the most famous images of the group, was originally conceived as one of a triptych of photographs, and intended as a surreal, satirical pop-art observation on The Beatles’ fame. Whitaker's inspirations for the images included the work of German surrealist Hans Bellmer, notably his 1937 book Die Puppe (La Poupée). Bellmer's images of puppets were first published in the French Surrealist journal Minotaure in 1934. Whitaker has also cited Meret Oppenheim as another important influence, notably her most famous creation "Lunch In Fur" (1936), a disturbing creation in which she covered a cup, saucer and spoon entirely in fur.

Whitaker: "It's an apparent switch-around of how you think. Can you imagine actually drinking out of a fur tea cup? I did a photograph of the Beatles covered in raw meat, dolls and false teeth. Putting meat, dolls and false teeth with The Beatles is essentially part of the same thing, the breakdown of what is regarded as normal. The actual conception for what I still call "Somnambulant Adventure" was Moses coming down from Mt. Sinai with the Ten Commandments. He comes across people worshipping a golden calf. All over the world I'd watched people worshipping like idols, like gods, four Beatles. To me they were just stock standard normal people. But this emotion that fans poured on them made me wonder where Christianity was heading".

It has been claimed that The Beatles intended the Butcher Sleeve to be a protest at the way their music was being "butchered" by their American label, Capitol Records. In a Nov. 15 1991 interview with Goldmine magazine, Whitaker discussed the Butcher Sleeve at length, and unequivocally put the "protest" claims to rest:

Goldmine: "How did that photo, featuring the Beatles among slabs of meat and decapitated dolls, come about? Was it your idea or the Beatles?"

Whitaker: It was mine. Absolutely. It was part of three pictures that should have gone into an icon. And it was a rough. If you could imagine, the background of that picture should have been all gold. Around the heads would have gone silver halos, jewelled. Then there are two other pictures that are in the book (The Unseen Beatles), but not in colour.

Goldmine: How did you prepare for the shoot?

Whitaker: It was hard work. I had to go to the local butcher and get pork. I had to go to a doll factory and find the dolls. I had to go to an eye factory and find the eyes. False teeth. There's a lot in that photograph. I think John's almost-last written words were about that particular cover; that was pointed out to me by Martin Harrison, who wrote the text to my book. I didn't even know that, but I'm learning a lot.

Goldmine: Why meat and dolls? There's been a lot of conjecture over the years about what that photo meant. The most popular theory is that it was a protest by the Beatles against Capitol Records for supposedly "butchering" their records in the States.

Whitaker: Rubbish, absolute nonsense. If the trilogy or triptych of the three photographs had ever come together, it would have made sense. There is another set of photos in the book which is the Beatles with a girl with her back toward you, hanging on to sausages. Those sausages were meant to be an umbilical cord. Does this start to open a few chapters?

Goldmine: Were you aware when you shot it that Capitol Records was going to use it as a record cover?

Whitaker: No.

Goldmine: Were you upset when they did and then when they pulled it and replaced it with another photo?

Whitaker: Well, I shot that photo too, of them sitting on a trunk, the one that they pasted over it. I fairly remember being bewildered by the whole thing. I had no reason to be bewildered by it, purely and simply, because it could certainly be construed as a fairly shocking collection of bits and pieces to stick on a group of people and represent that [the "butchering" of the Beatles' records] in this country [the U.S.].

Interviewed at the time (1966) in the British music magazine Disc and Music Echo, Whitaker said:

"I wanted to do a real experiment - people will jump to wrong conclusions about it being sick, but the whole thing is based on simplicity -- linking four very real people with something real. I got George to knock some nails into John’s head, and took some sausages along to get some other pictures, dressed them up in white smocks as butchers, and this is the result -- the use of the camera as a means of creating situations."

Whitaker was later quoted as saying that the basic motivation for making "A Somnambulant Adventure" came from the fact that he and The Beatles were "really fed up at taking what one had hoped would be designer-friendly publicity pictures"; in the interview conducted just before his death in 1980, John Lennon confirmed this.

"It was inspired by our boredom and resentment at having to do another photo session and another Beatles thing. We were sick to death of it. Bob was into Dalí and making surreal pictures."

Whitaker intended the triptych to be his "personal comment on the mass adulation of the group and the illusory nature of stardom … I had toured quite a lot of the world with them by then, and I was continually amused by the public adulation of four people".

The images in the triptych were conceived as the foundation of a much more elaborate work. He had planned to retouch the photos to give them the appearance of religious icons. The background was to be painted gold like a Russian icon and to have the Fab Four's heads surrounded by jewelled halos, with the photos bordered in rainbow colours. This decoration, contrasted with the bizarre situations of the photos themselves, was evidently intended to create a surreal juxtaposition between the band's image and celebrity, and the underlying fact that they were just as real and human as everyone else.

Whitaker: "John played with all sorts of bits and pieces before we actually did the picture. I did a few outtake pictures which were of them actually playing with a box full of dolls which they pulled out and stuck all over themselves. There was an enormous amount of laughter. There was even George Harrison banging nails into John's head with a hammer. The actual conception of what is termed the ‘Butcher's Sleeve’ is a reasonably diverse piece of thinking ..."

"...the [Butcher] cover was an unfinished concept. It was just one of a series of photographs that would have made up a gate-fold cover. Behind the head of each Beatle would have been a golden halo and in the halo would have been placed a semi-precious stone. Then the background would have contained more gold, so it was rather like a Russian icon. It was just after John Lennon had said that the Beatles were more popular than Jesus Christ. In a material world that was an extremely true statement."

The three main images taken at the March 25 session were intended to be the basis for the three panels of the triptych. The first photo shows The Beatles facing a woman with her back to the camera, her hands raised as if in surprise (or worship) while The Beatles hold a string of sausages. This was meant to represent the 'birth' of the Beatles, with the sausages serving as an umbilical cord. Whitaker explained: "My own thought was how the hell do you show that they've been born out of a woman the same as anybody else? An umbilical cord was one way of doing it."

The centre panel of the triptych is the image nowadays referred to as the "butcher" photo. It shows The Beatles dressed in butchers’ coats, draped with slabs of red meat, false teeth, glass eyes and dismembered doll parts. This picture was actually titled "A Somnambulant Adventure" and Bob's intention was to add other elements to it which would create a jarring juxtaposition between idolisation of The Beatles’ as gods of the pop world and their flesh and blood reality as ordinary human beings, but he was never able to realise this.

The photograph that would have been used for the right-hand panel of the triptych is one of George Harrison standing behind a seated John Lennon, hammer in hand, apparently driving nails into John's head. Whitaker explained that this picture was intended to demonstrate that the Beatles were not an illusion, not something to be worshipped, but people as real and substantial as "a piece of wood".

A fourth picture taken at the same session, but apparently not planned as part of the triptych, is also included in Whitaker's book The Unseen Beatles. It shows John framing Ringo's head with a cardboard box, on one of the flaps of which is written "2,000,000".

"I wanted to illustrate that, in a way, there was nothing more amazing about Ringo than anyone else on this earth. In this life he was just one of two million members of the human race. The idolization of fans reminded me of the story of the worship of the golden calf."

Like the famous 1963 photo of Christine Keeler taken by his contemporary Lewis Morley, Whitaker's "Butcher" photo soon passed out of his control and took on a life of its own. The Beatles themselves seem to have been behind the use of the photo in British trade advertisements and then on the cover of the Capitol album Yesterday and Today. The prime mover seems to have been Paul McCartney. In his book Shout, Beatles biographer Philip Norman claims that Brian Epstein had "misgivings" about the picture and felt it would disrupt the band's meticulously managed image, which had taken a hammering in the wake of the "bigger than Jesus" controversy. But according to Norman, the band overruled him.

Interestingly, the "Butcher" photo made three appearances in print in the UK before it was released in the USA on the cover of Yesterday And Today. It was first published on page 2 of New Musical Express on 3 June 1966 in an EMI advertisement promoting the forthcoming "Rain/Paperback Writer" single, and the same ad was published in Disc and Music Echo the next day, June 4. Both these versions were in monochrome. Its third appearance (and its first in colour) was on the front page of Disc and Music Echo on 11 June 1966 under the headline, "BEATLES: WHAT A CARVE-UP!" It can also reportedly be glimpsed in photos taken during the making of the Rain and Paperback Writer promotional film-clips, shot on 19 May, in which Paul McCartney can be seen inspecting transparencies from the 25 March photo session. None of these appearances seem to have caused any appreciable adverse reaction in the UK, even though they were published only days before Capitol's promotional release of the "Butcher Sleeve" version of Yesterday and Today.

At this time, up to and including Revolver, all The Beatles' American LPs (released by Capitol Records) differed markedly from the original UK releases from EMI. The Capitol LPs were collections of material culled from the Beatles' previously-released British albums and singles, selected and packaged by Capitol especially for the American market. Yesterday And Today included songs from the earlier Help! and Rubber Soul LPs plus, unusually, four songs from Revolver, which would not be released in Britain for another three weeks. It was Capitol's habit of cherry-picking album tracks and singles to compiled their own albums that was the origin of the claims about the Butcher Sleeve being some kind of protest against the American label.

Capitol printed the cover in early June, using the "Butcher" photo, and the release was scheduled for 15 June 1966. Estimates vary considerably as to how many copies of the album were printed and/or distributed. Whitaker puts the number at 250,000 but other sources range from as high as 750,000 to 400,000 to as low as 60,000. According to another estimate, about 25,000 copies were sold prior to the recall. Mojo magazine reported that 60,000 copies were distributed to radio, media and Capitol branch offices, who showed it to retailers.

Whitaker: "Having finished that particular picture, it was snatched away from me and sent off to America. It was reproduced as a record cover without ever having the artwork completed by me. The cover layout was somebody else's conception. It was a good idea to ban it at the time, because it made no sense at all. It was just this rather horrific image of four Beatles, whom everybody loved, covered in raw meat, the arms, legs and torsos of dolls, and false teeth. But they are only objects placed on the Beatles, rather like making a movie. I mean what you want to read into it is entirely up to you. I was trying to show that the Beatles were flesh and blood."

It has been suggested that Lennon was the main impetus behind the photo being used, but according to Alan Livingstone, Capitol's former president, (quoted in Mojo magazine in 2002), the decision to use the photo used on Yesterday And Today was taken largely at the insistence of Paul McCartney:

Alan Livingstone: "The reaction came back that the dealers refused to handle them. I called London and we went back and forth. My contact was mainly with Paul McCartney. He was adamant and felt very strongly that we should go forward. He said ‘It’s our comment on the war’. I don’t know why it was a comment on the war or if it would be interpreted that way."

Capitol were understandably nervous about adverse publicity, and could ill-afford another Beatles-related controversy. The label was still reeling from the fallout from John Lennon's notorious "bigger than Jesus" quip in March 1966, which had sparked a wave of protests and record burnings in conservative areas of the United States. The company reacted swiftly, issuing letters of apology, and on Tuesday 14 June, Capitol PR manager Ron Tepper issued an official letter of recall in which he quoted a statement from Capitol's president, Alan W. Livingston:

"The original cover, created in England, was intended as a ‘pop art' satire. However a sampling of public opinion in the United States indicates that the cover design is subject to misinterpretation. For this reason, and to avoid any possible controversy or undeserved harm to the Beatles' image or reputation, Capitol has chosen to withdraw the LP and substitute a more generally acceptable design."

The "Butcher sleeve" LPs were withdrawn and returned, and a new cover was hastily prepared at a reported cost of $250,000. The offending Butcher photo was replaced by an unremarkable Whitaker shot of the Beatles gathered around a large steamer trunk, taken in Brian Epstein's office. It was rushed to America,  where Capitol staff spent the following weekend taking the discs from the returned "butcher" sleeves and putting them in the new sleeve. Several thousand copies of the original cover were destroyed and replaced by the ‘cabin trunk’ sleeve, but Capitol eventually decided that it would be more economical to simply paste the new cover photo over the old one. After the album was released, news of the ‘paste-over’ operation leaked out, and Beatle fans across America began steaming the cabin trunk photos off of their copies of Yesterday and Today in the hope of finding the "butcher" cover underneath.

The Butcher cover is still one of the most valuable and sought-after pieces of Beatle memorabilia. George Harrison himself called it "the definitive Beatles collectible" and Bob Whitaker relates the story of a woman who came up to him with an unpeeled ‘paste-over’ cover in the US, had him autograph it, and promptly sold it for US$40,000.

The scarcest copies of Yesterday and Today are the so-called "first state" versions, those still in their original shrink-wrapping, and the rarest and most valuable of these are the ‘first-state’ stereo pressings. Prior to 1987, there were only two sealed stereo copies and about six mono copies known to exist. Then, on Thanksgiving weekend 1987 at the Los Angeles Beatlefest convention, Peter Livingston, the son of former Capitol Records President Alan Livingston, walked into the Beatlefest dealer room at the show carrying a box of original first-state Butcher cover albums. Nearly every copy was sealed and in mint condition.

It transpired that after the recall in 1966, Peter's father had taken home a full box of the albums (five stereo and about twenty mono copies) from the inventory that would otherwise have had the new cover pasted over it. Stored in a cupboard under perfect conditions in the Livingston home, the albums lay untouched for twenty-one years. A canny collector instantly negotiated a purchase for one of the two stereo copies for US$2500 and a crowd quickly grew as word spread. The asking price for the mono copies was US$1000 and within a matter of minutes, the ten mono and two stereo copies were sold. Some of these copies were resold during the show for even higher sums; just one week later the prices had climbed to US$2000 for mono copies and US$10,000 for the stereo.

Over the next few months, under pressure from collectors, Peter Livingston slowly sold the remaining mono copies, by which time the price has risen to US$3000. Since then the price of mono copies has risen to over $5000. In the early 1990s the best of the four of the four sealed stereo Livingston copies sold to a US collector for $20,000 cash, a world-record price. In 1994 this was sold to a California collector for US$25,000.

Disraeli Gears
By 1967 The Beatles had withdrawn from touring and during the first half of 1967 they were ensconced in Abbey Rd working on their magnum opus, Sgt Pepper’s Lonely Hearts Club. With the demands of touring now removed, Whitaker's association with The Beatles and NEMS came to an end. By this time he was living and working in a residential studio space which he called Joubert Studios, located in the well-known building called The Pheasantry in King's Rd, Chelsea. This venerable artists’ colony was also home to some old friends from Australia—Martin Sharp and Philippe Mora and Germaine Greer.

Martin Sharp: "Bob setting to work with The Beatles was a real breakthrough. When Richard Neville and I left for England, Bob was on the top on my list of people to contact."

Whitaker's next major project, and one of his most famous collaborations, was created with Sharp—the classic psychedelic album cover for the landmark 1967 LP Disraeli Gears by British supergroup Cream.

Whitaker: "Cream were going to do a tour of the north of England and Scotland. I just jumped in a car. Various things presented themselves to us on our journey around Scotland, none of which I could have recreated in a studio. I was very lucky that Martin had discovered day-glo paint. I had all the pictures, which I knew were for some form of publicity. I made a whole series of colour prints and Martin just started cutting them up - much to my annoyance, because they weren't cheap to do. He then laid them out on a 12-inch square as a piece of finished artwork and then painted all over it."

Whitaker's friendship with Martin Sharp and Greer also led to him becoming closely involved with Oz magazine in 1967-68 and he contributed to many of the early editions of the famous underground magazine, including a famous collage depicting a woman seated on a flying toilet symbolically defecating on the British Houses of Parliament.

Later career
Over the next few years Whitaker gradually moved away from the pop scene and back to the art world where he had begun his photographic career. One of his most famous subjects from this period was a longtime hero, the doyen of surrealism, Salvador Dalí, whom he photographed several times between 1967 and 1972. He first met Dalí at his Spanish mansion and told him that he wanted to use his camera "to get inside his head".

Whitaker: "I said: 'I'll photograph inside every hole I can find'. I started by photographing his ears, then inside his mouth and up his nose."

The photos he took include three extreme close-ups of Dalí, plus one of Whitaker's wife Susie basking topless under the Spanish sun alongside the artist. The extreme close-ups were the first steps towards a photographic style that he finally developed fully in the 1990s, a concept he now calls the "Whitograph", shooting extreme close-ups with all 36 exposures of a roll of film to create a single portrait.

In 1969 he photographed Mick Jagger (who nicknamed him "Super Click") during the production of the Nicholas Roeg film Performance and he accompanied Jagger to Australia to photograph him on location during the filming of Ned Kelly. These were published in book form in 1970 under the title Mick Jagger Is Ned Kelly.

Whitaker also worked as a photojournalist, covering major world events for Time and Life magazines, including the Florence floods, the war in Cambodia and Vietnam and the bloody war of independence in Bangladesh. One of the most famous photographs from this period, the eerily beautiful "Bangladesh (1971)" depicts two dead soldiers near the Indian border, lying in golden sunlight, as if asleep.

In the early Seventies, Whitaker effectively retired from photography and for almost twenty years he farmed his property in Sussex. In 1991 he gathered some of his previously unpublished photographs of The Beatles for his successful book The Unseen Beatles (although many more unseen negatives apparently exist). The book was very successful and was followed by a touring exhibition of his photographs from the 1960s, "Underground London", which included photographs of the individual Beatles as well as many previously unseen shots from the "Butcher Sleeve" session. The exhibition visited The National Gallery of Victoria in 1998, before heading to America for a two-year tour.

For many years, Robert Whitaker fought an ongoing battle with Apple Corps over the rights to the "Butcher Sleeve" photo. Apple Corps told him they do not want the image reproduced as a book cover, postcard, poster, "virtually in no form whatsoever", a move which so angered Whitaker  that he considered making an enormous print of the "Butcher Sleeve" for his "Underground London" exhibition and putting it behind closed doors so that people would have to file in one at a time.

Apple Corps has its own photo library which manages the use of copyright Beatle material around the world. When asked for his opinion on the situation, the late Derek Taylor, Apple Corps' long-serving press manager, was quoted as saying that "the person who might know who has the actual copyright to the ‘Butcher's Sleeve’ picture is not yet born." Taylor felt that, because Whitaker was employed by Epstein and NEMS at the time he took the picture, this gave Apple the legal copyright, although he recognised that it was Whitaker "who took the picture, who thought of the idea, and that would give him a proprietary moral right." Taylor added that although he has never personally enjoyed the picture "it has its place in history as part of their story. As a piece of Beatles' art it has its place on the wall."

Taylor also claimed that "George still doesn't like it", (mainly, it seems, because Harrison subsequently became a vegetarian). But Taylor reportedly believed that the banning of the cover was a mistake and found its replacement less innocuous than it seems. "I mean, which is worse, Beatles with meat all over them, or four Beatles in a trunk in a hotel room. If you really think about it what would they be doing in a trunk "?

Whitaker: "I made that dumb-ass photo of the Beatles with the trunk in Brian Epstein’s office when we were all in Argyll Street, next door to the London Palladium. Derek is right. It was far more stupid than anything else I could think of. The trunk was to hand in the office, so I thought that by putting the light meter in the picture it might convey an idea of the speed of light running so fast that it shot straight back up your arse. It was just to see what could become a record cover. "

In the mid-1990s Apple Managing Director Neil Aspinall began negotiations with Whitaker for the use of 300 of his images of the Beatles in the television documentary and book, The Beatles Anthology, but it proved to be a short-lived rapprochement:

Whitaker: "On one day Neil Aspinall is offering me £80,000 for the use of my pictures in his Anthology of the Beatles, chatting about their past around the table of an English pub. The next day Aspinall phones to say that he thinks I should give the Anthology all the pictures for nothing, having spent six months deciding which images should be reprinted, retouched and repaired. We, the Beatles, own Whitaker's life. Needless to say, they got nothing."

In 1997 Melbourne's Gallery 101 mounted a world-premiere exhibition of Whitaker's photographs of Mick Jagger, taken during the production of the film Ned Kelly.

In February–March 2002 his photos of George Harrison featured as part of a photographic tribute to George staged at the Govinda Galleries in Washington. In November 2002 he returned to Australia to open a 40th anniversary retrospective of his work entitled Yesterday & and Today: The Photography of Robert Whitaker 1962-2002 at the Monash Gallery of Art in Melbourne, which ran from 30 November 2002 to 26 January 2003. It included many previously unseen images from Whitaker’s early days in Australia, through his European work with The Beatles, Cream, The Seekers, Bob Hughes, Man Ray, Salvador Dalí and Peggy Guggenheim, to his more recent work with Australian artists such as Stelarc, Bruce Armstrong, and Howard Arkley.

In the early 2000s Robert Whitaker worked on compiling a digital archive of his work, and his photographs of The Seekers were chosen for a special commemorative Australia Post stamp issue to celebrate the group’s 40th anniversary.

Death
Whitaker died on 20 September 2011 following a long illness, aged 71. He left a widow and three children.

References

External links

IQ Art
"Shooting Stars" Heinrich, Karen, The Age'', 28 November 2002
Magidson Fine Art, Aspen
"Who Butchered The Beatles?"Mikkelson, David P.
"Yesterday & Today: The Photography of Robert Whitaker 1962–2002"Monash Gallery of Art
"Cream: Disraeli Gears"Pattingale, Graeme
 Disraeli Gears Photo SessionsPattingale, Graeme
"Review: Robert Whitaker at The National Gallery Victoria."Taylor, Roger
"Hans Bellmer in The Art Institute of Chicago: The Wandering Libido and the Hysterical Body"Taylor, Sue
"Everything You Always Wanted To Know About … The Beatles Butcher Cover"York, Robert

1939 births
2011 deaths
Photographers from Hertfordshire
People from Harpenden
People from Haywards Heath
Album-cover and concert-poster artists